Shades of Ian Hunter: The Ballad of Ian Hunter and Mott the Hoople is a compilation album by Ian Hunter, consisting of tracks by Hunter's previous band Mott the Hoople, and solo Hunter tracks as well.  It was released in 1979 as a double-LP.

Track listing
 "All the Young Dudes"
 "One of the Boys"
 "Sweet Jane"
 "All the Way from Memphis"
 "I Wish I Was Your Mother"
 "The Golden Age of Rock 'n' Roll"
 "Roll Away the Stone"
 "Marionette"
 "Rose"
 "Foxy, Foxy"
 "Where Do You All Come From"
 "Rest in Peace"
 "Saturday Gigs"
 "Once Bitten Twice Shy"
 "3,000 Miles from Here"
 "I Get So Excited"
 "You Nearly Did Me In"
 "All American Alien Boy"
 "England Rocks"
 "Wild N' Free"
 "Justice of the Peace"
 "Overnight Angels"
 "Golden Opportunity"

Personnel

 David Bowie	Composer, Producer
 Dale Buffin Griffin	Composer
 Ian Hunter	Composer, Guitar, Primary Artist, Producer, Vocals
 Gary Lyons	Engineer
 Mott the Hoople	Primary Artist, Producer
 Mick Ralphs	Composer
 Lou Reed	Composer
 Mick Ronson	Guitar, Producer, Vocals
 Earl Slick	Composer
 Roy Thomas	Producer
 Pete Watts	Composer
 Gary Weems	Guitar

References

1979 compilation albums
Ian Hunter (singer) albums
Mott the Hoople albums
Columbia Records compilation albums